The 2012 China Open Super Series is a top level badminton competition held from November 13, 2012, to November 18, 2012, in Shanghai, China.It is the eleventh BWF Super Series competition on the 2012 BWF Super Series schedule. The total purse for the event was $400,000.

Men's singles

Seeds

  Chen Long
  Chen Jin
  Simon Santoso (withdrew)
  Du Pengyu
  Kenichi Tago
  Sho Sasaki
  Nguyen Tien Minh
  Jan Ø. Jørgensen

Top half

Bottom half

Finals

Women's singles

Seeds

  Wang Yihan
  Li Xuerui
  Saina Nehwal (withdrew due to knee injury)
  Wang Shixian
  Juliane Schenk
  Tine Baun
  Sung Ji-hyun
  Jiang Yanjiao

Top half

Bottom half

Finals

Men's doubles

Seeds

  Mathias Boe / Carsten Mogensen
  Cai Yun / Fu Haifeng
  Koo Kien Keat / Tan Boon Heong
  Hiroyuki Endo / Kenichi Hayakawa
  Kim Ki-jung / Kim Sa-rang
  Hirokatsu Hashimoto / Noriyasu Hirata
  Hong Wei / Shen Ye
  Bodin Issara / Maneepong Jongjit

Top half

Bottom half

Finals

Women's doubles

Seeds

  Tian Qing / Zhao Yunlei
  Wang Xiaoli / Yu Yang
  Bao Yixin / Zhong Qianxin
  Christinna Pedersen / Kamilla Rytter Juhl
  Shizuka Matsuo / Mami Naito
  Miyuki Maeda / Satoko Suetsuna
  Misaki Matsutomo / Ayaka Takahashi
  Eom Hye-won / Jang Ye-na

Top half

Bottom half

Finals

Mixed doubles

Seeds

  Xu Chen / Ma Jin
  Zhang Nan / Zhao Yunlei
  Tantowi Ahmad / Lilyana Natsir
  Joachim Fischer Nielsen / Christinna Pedersen
  Chan Peng Soon / Goh Liu Ying
  Sudket Prapakamol / Saralee Thoungthongkam
  Fran Kurniawan / Shendy Puspa Irawati
  Shoji Sato / Shizuka Matsuo

Top half

Bottom half

Finals

References
tournamentsoftware.com

China Open (badminton)
China Open Super Series Premier
China Open Super Series Premier